Charles McGillivray (5 July 1912 – 7 November 1986) was a Scottish footballer and manager. His position was inside forward (winger).

Career
Having previously played for Manchester United in England, and for Ayr United, Celtic, Motherwell and Dundee in Scotland (followed by several guest spells during World War II), McGillivray was playing for Dundee United when he accepted the offer to become manager in November 1944. The club's youngest ever manager, McGillivray was in charge for eleven months, resigning in late 1945 when it was announced the club were looking for somebody from outside to manage. McGillivray had the misfortune to preside over United's record home defeat (albeit in an unofficial wartime competition), a 9–1 loss to Aberdeen in February 1945.

He became Stirling Albion's player–coach in November 1945, leaving the club at end of the season. He later played five Eastern League games, scoring five times.

References

1912 births
1986 deaths
Celtic F.C. players
Manchester United F.C. players
Motherwell F.C. players
Dundee United F.C. players
Dundee United F.C. managers
Scottish football managers
People from Whitburn, West Lothian
Footballers from West Lothian
Ayr United F.C. players
Dundee F.C. players
Heart of Midlothian F.C. wartime guest players
Albion Rovers F.C. wartime guest players
Greenock Morton F.C. wartime guest players
Dunfermline Athletic F.C. wartime guest players
Hibernian F.C. wartime guest players
Scottish Football League players
Scottish Junior Football Association players
English Football League players
Association football wingers
Scottish footballers